Zbylut may refer to:

People
 Zbylut (given name), a Slavic male given name

Places
Zbylutów, a village in Lower Silesian Voivodeship, Poland
Zbyluty, a settlement in Warmian-Masurian Voivodeship, Poland

See also
 Zbigniew
 Zbyszko